The ICC Women's T20I Team of the Year is an honour awarded each year by the International Cricket Council. It recognizes the top women's cricket players from around the world in the T20I format of the game. The team does not actually compete, but exists solely as an honorary entity.

List

Winners 
Players marked bold won the ICC Women's T20I Cricketer of the Year in that respective year:

Appearances by player 
Players marked bold are still active in T20I matches and years marked bold indicate they won the ICC Women's T20I Cricketer of the Year in that respective year:

Appearances by nation

See also 

 ICC Men's ODI Team of the Year
 ICC Women's ODI Team of the Year
ICC Men's T20I Team of the Year

References

External links 

Women's cricket competitions